Mozavaptan (INN) is a vasopressin receptor antagonist marketed by Otsuka. In Japan, it was approved in October 2006 for hyponatremia (low blood sodium levels) caused by syndrome of inappropriate antidiuretic hormone (SIADH) due to ADH producing tumors.

References
 
 

Diuretics
Benzanilides
Benzazepines
Vasopressin receptor antagonists
2-Tolyl compounds